Wpromote is a digital marketing agency headquartered in El Segundo, CA.

History 
Wpromote was founded in 2001 by Michael Mothner in his dorm room at Dartmouth College with peers Michael Stone and Michael Block. The agency originally started as a Pay Per Click advertising company and is now a full service digital marketing agency.

Since its inception, Wpromote has expanded into eight additional cities across the U.S. It is now the largest independent digital marketing agency in the country, following the acquisition of independent agencies Standing Dog, PrimeVisibility and DemandWave. Wpromote has expanded from its headquarters in El Segundo to Dallas, TX, Houston, TX, San Francisco, CA, Chicago, IL, Melville, NY, New York City and Denver, CO.

In 2016, Wpromote's El Segundo offices were used to film an episode of the HBO series Silicon Valley, which has assisted the agency in increasing its national exposure as its logo was included in the fictional employees’ lanyards and on the front of the building. Through this episode, Wpromote brought on new clients including retailers Forever21 and RVCA, which bolstered the roster of major brands that they already service, including Toyota and Verizon.

References

Search engine optimization
Companies based in California
Marketing companies established in 2001